Space Lords is a collection of science fiction short stories by the American writer Cordwainer Smith. It was first published by Pyramid Books in 1965.

The stories belong to a series describing a future history set in the universe of the Instrumentality of Mankind.

The book is dedicated "to the memory of Eleanor Jackson of Louisa, Virginia, 20 February 1919 to 30 November 1964". In a moving letter to her, we learn that she was an African-American housekeeper for the author during many years, and that she died unexpectedly while visiting him to help when he was sick and working on this book. (Note that in Cordwainer Smith's novel "Norstrilia", the hero is accompanied by his "workwoman Eleanor", to whom he shows great loyalty - "It's up to me to do what I can for her. Always.")

Contents
 "Mother Hitton's Littul Kittons", a novelette first published in Galaxy in June 1961.
 "The Dead Lady of Clown Town", a novella first published in Galaxy in August 1964.
 "Drunkboat", a novelette first published in Amazing Stories in October 1963.
 "The Ballad of Lost C'Mell", a novelette first published in Galaxy in October 1962.
 A Planet Named Shayol", a novelette first published in Galaxy in October 1961.

References

 
 Cordwainer Smith The official website, accessed June 21, 2014.

1965 short story collections
Short story collections by Cordwainer Smith
Pyramid Books books